Norðradalur is a village on the western coast of the Faroese island of Streymoy in Tórshavn Municipality. The 2015 population was 15. Its postal code is FO 178. The village lies in a large valley surrounded be steep cliffs and the ocean, with views over Koltur.

Norðradalur has a columnar basalt wall, which is used as the main climbing area for the young, but growing Faroese climbing community.

See also
 List of towns in the Faroe Islands

References

External links
Personal Danish site with photographs of Norðradalur

Populated places in the Faroe Islands